Reformed Dutch Church of Stone Arabia, also known as Stone Arabia Reformed Church, is a historic Dutch Reformed church located near Nelliston in Stone Arabia, Montgomery County, New York.  It was built in 1788 and is a simple rectangular building constructed of cut limestone blocks.  It has a somewhat flattened gable roof and a belfry.  It features a Palladian window in the Georgian style. Located immediately south is the Trinity Lutheran Church and Cemetery.

The Reformed Dutch Church of Stone Arabia  was added to the National Register of Historic Places in 1977.

References

External links

Excerpt from 

Reformed Church in America churches in New York (state)
Churches on the National Register of Historic Places in New York (state)
Historic American Buildings Survey in New York (state)
Georgian architecture in New York (state)
Churches completed in 1787
Churches in Montgomery County, New York
1787 establishments in New York (state)
18th-century churches in the United States
National Register of Historic Places in Montgomery County, New York